Islam Behery (Arabic: إسلام بحيري; born 1974 in Siflaq, Sohag Governorate), is an Egyptian writer and the host of With Islam on Al-Kahera Wel Nas. On November 5, 2018 he began a new program, "Islam Hurr" on Alhurra.

In April 2015, Al-Behairy used his program to call for reforming Islam by insulting the well-known scholars of Islam and said that many fatwas were wrong and people shouldn’t take fatwas from scholars and should go straightly to Qur’an without even having to learn the knowledge required, a message Al-Azhar University condemned as an insult to Islam. Al Kahera suspended his program indefinitely. He was arrested, charged with insulting Islam, convicted, and sentenced to five years in prison. Al-Behairy appealed the sentence but a court rejected the appeal in October. However, in December, a court reduced his sentence to one year in jail, and he was later pardoned by the President of Egypt, Abdel Fattah el-Sisi.

References

Egyptian reformers
Living people
Egyptian liberalists
1974 births